

265001–265100 

|-bgcolor=#f2f2f2
| colspan=4 align=center | 
|}

265101–265200 

|-bgcolor=#f2f2f2
| colspan=4 align=center | 
|}

265201–265300 

|-bgcolor=#f2f2f2
| colspan=4 align=center | 
|}

265301–265400 

|-bgcolor=#f2f2f2
| colspan=4 align=center | 
|}

265401–265500 

|-id=490
| 265490 Szabados || 2005 GW || László Szabados (born 1948), a Hungarian astronomer and Gaia researcher, who studies Cepheid variable stars || 
|}

265501–265600 

|-id=594
| 265594 Keletiágnes ||  || Ágnes Keleti (born 1921), a Hungarian artistic gymnast and coach, the member of the International Gymnastics Hall of Fame. || 
|}

265601–265700 

|-bgcolor=#f2f2f2
| colspan=4 align=center | 
|}

265701–265800 

|-bgcolor=#f2f2f2
| colspan=4 align=center | 
|}

265801–265900 

|-bgcolor=#f2f2f2
| colspan=4 align=center | 
|}

265901–266000 

|-id=924
| 265924 Franceclemente ||  || Francesco Clemente (born 1952), an Italian painter and designer || 
|}

References 

265001-266000